The El Alamein Memorial Fountain is a heritage-listed fountain and war memorial located at Macleay Street in the inner Sydney locale of Kings Cross in the City of Sydney local government area of New South Wales, Australia. It was designed by the Australian architects Robert Woodward and Phill Taranto as employed by architectural firm Woodward and Woodward. The fountain was built from 1959 to 1961. It is also known as El Alamein Fountain, Fitzroy Gardens Group, Kings Cross Fountain and King's Cross Fountain. It was added to the New South Wales State Heritage Register on 14 January 2011. The El Alamein Fountain was commissioned as a memorial to soldiers who died in 1942 during World War II in two battles at El Alamein, Egypt.

War memorial

The Australian 9th Division fought in both the first (July 1942) and second (November 1942) battles of El Alamein during World War II. Both were important for the course of the war. They halted the advance of Axis forces into Egypt and routed them, and are considered a turning point in the Western Desert Campaign. The El Alamein Fountain in Sydney commemorates the Australian army's roles in the North Africa campaign in general, and the two El Alamein battles in particular.

Competition for  the El Alamein Memorial Fountain
The competition had been organised by the Sydney Fountains Committee, which was established in September 1958. Its aim was to put fountains in public places in Sydney to enhance their natural beauty and to commemorate families, individuals and organisations. A Designs Committee was responsible for the design competitions for fountains in a number of selected sites, such as the Fitzroy Gardens in Kings Cross, Moore Park, Customs House Square, and Macquarie Place. The competition for the Fitzroy Gardens fountain was assessed by a panel of architects (Max Collard, President of the RAIA (NSW Chapter), and Professor Leslie Wilkinson), sculptors (Douglas Annand), and the City Council.

The Committee's design brief for the fountain was: "The fountain shall cost not more than  complete. Whilst the fountain is not to be a war memorial in the generally accepted sense, it is nevertheless contemplated that Fitzroy Gardens will become a local assembly point on Anzac Day and the fountain will be known as a war memorial fountain." This association between the park and a war memorial began in October 1957 when the Kings Cross Sub-Branch of the Returned Sailors, Soldiers and Airmen's Imperial League of Australia approached the Council about the possibility of changing the name of the park to El Alamein Park. In December 1958 the Council resolved to hold a public competition for designs for a fountain to be provided in Fitzroy Gardens that may also serve as a memorial.

The Australasian Post explained further: 'The plan for the fountain was suggested by the King's Cross RSL, when they asked that a place be set aside for memorial services "because older servicemen are finding it very difficult to get to and from the Memorial gates opposite the wharves in Woolloomooloo".

The designer
Robert (Bob) Woodward (1923-2010) together with Phill Taranto was commissioned to build the fountain in 1959. Woodward, himself an Army veteran, was 36 at the time and had studied architecture at Sydney University, and worked in Finland. The structure was completed in 1961 and officially opened by Harry Jensen, Lord Mayor of Sydney. The fountain made such a name for Woodward and the firm that he went on to design many others, and his fountains are his best-known works.

The design
Woodward's Modernist design has been variously described as looking like a blown thistle, or dandelion. The sculpture is made of bronze with brass pipes. The small-nozzled spray heads make the sphere-shaped spray very fine, and sensitive to air movement. The fountain sits on a hexagonal base, where the water cascades down three levels. It is illuminated at night.

Reception of the fountain since completion
Tom Heath's appraisal of El Alamein in 1962 captured the excitement of the moment:

El Alamein Fountain won the inaugural RAIA NSW Chapter Civic Design Award in 1964. Woodward explained 'We had nominated it for design awards but it was considered not to be architecture and so it didn't get an award. [The NSW Institute of Architects] then instigated a new award, the Civic Design Award, because of the El Alamein Fountain'.

' "A fountain of great beauty", said the Judges, in presenting the new NSW Chapter of the RAIA Civic Design Award to architects Woodward, Tarantino and Wallace for the breathtaking El Alamein Fountain at King's Cross, Sydney. The jury considered there could hardly be a more appropriate recipient of this first Civic Design Award'.

An article in the popular magazine Australasian Post in 1967 stated:

Freeland's Architecture in Australia, 1967 stated:

Carol Henty wrote for The Bulletin in 1978:

In an interview with Woodward in 1996, architectural historians Paul Alan Johnson and Susan Lorne Johnson stated, 'Australians really seem to have taken the fountain to their hearts... Australians don't usually seem to be overly enthusiastic about their sculpture or their architecture... The fountain is now an icon in Australia and internationally admired'. 'The El Alamein Fountain represents an important technological innovation in fountain design, and has been much replicated throughout the world.'

Cultural impact
The fountain won Woodward the New South Wales Institute of Architects Civic Design Award in 1964. Over the years, its iconic shape has made it a well-known landmark that has been imitated by other builders.

As the focal point of the Kings Cross area, the fountain often serves as a meeting place.

Description 
'This fountain has a globe-like shape, with a diameter of 12 ft 6 in (3.81 m) and comprises 211 radially arranged "stalks" fitted to a hollow metal globe, itself placed on top of a brass pipe column with a length of 10 ft (3.05 m) and a diameter of 4 in. (10 cm). The central globe is made of cast brass [in fact bronze, according to CMP] and its diameter measures 46 cm. Each stalk consists of a tube 1.5 inch [2 cm] thick at the base and reducing to 0.5 inch [0.8 cm] at the outer end. A specially constructed nozzle has been fitted to each of these extremities. . . [There are] three terraced pools made of concrete and covered with white mosaic glass tiles. The perimeter coping is faced with quartzite and the two upper pools' spillways are formed by bronze dentils. The water is pumped through the line strainer - at a rate of 500 gallons (2,270 litres) per minute and a pressure of 22 lb. [10 kg] per square inch - up to the central sphere where it emerges from each of the 211 nozzles as a thin 18 inch [45 cm] disc of water. These disks of water merge and create the impression of a huge thistledown [or dandelion]. The water from the nozzles falls first to the top pool and then runs between the spillway dentils from pool to pool. Through nine glory hole outlets and underground pipes the water returns into the screening baskets and back to the tanks so that it can circulate again.'. The glory holes compensate almost exactly for the consecutive reduction in weir length from pool to pool. Each glory hole drains the equivalent of ~32 troughs. This means that the weirs draining the pools and all 9 glory holes have identical flow.

The fountain sits above the top pool of a series of four pools, set among cobblestone paving near the south-western edge of Fitzroy Gardens. As the land is sloping gently eastward, its design responds to the site, with successive pools lower down this slope towards the east. The top pool in which the fountain apparatus is mounted is hexagonal in form. Lower pools reflect this form but are larger, with expanded dimensions. A series of spillway dentils in bronze direct water down from pool to pool through a fine series of "teeth" which make a very precise noise, helping dull traffic noise.

Plaques
Below ground to its immediate north-east is the fountain's pump room, which houses its operative mechanisms. Also to the north east of the fountain is a plinth with two plaques which read:

'THE EL ALAMEIN MEMORIAL FOUNTAIN
THIS FOUNTAIN WAS ERECTED IN COMMEMORIATION
OF
THE DEEDS OF THE NINTH DIVISION, AUSTRALIAN IMPERIAL FORCES
IN WORLD WAR II
BY
THE COUNCIL OF THE CITY OF SYDNEY
AND PLACED IN OPERATION BY
THE RIGHT HONOURABLE THE LORD MAYOR OF SYDNEY
ALDERMAN H.F. JENSEN
ON
18.11.61
E.W. ADAMS
TOWN CLERK'

'THIS FOUNTAIN WAS DESIGNED BY
AND CONSTRUCTED UNDER
THE SUPERVISION OF
WOODWARD & TARANTO
ARCHITECTS'

The complete fountain head above the waterline and stalks were originally manufactured by Eric L. Williams under the supervision of Robert Woodward.

Lighting installation 
At night, this lighted fountain makes the impression of a display of fireworks bursting asunder. The light emanates from six reflector lamps of 500 W, mounted under the water-level of the upper basin. These lamps are placed around the main delivery pipe, in a circle with a diameter of some 1.20 m. Each lamp is mounted in a metal cylinder with a clear Pyrex glass cover and a bronze-coloured spun metal shielding ring which projects several inches above the water level. For maintenance purposes the cylinders can be reached from the equipment room under the central pool. This room houses a 25 h.p. electric motor, a 3-inch pump, a 3-inch strainer, switchboards and a set of three stainless steel screening baskets. Below the floor is a concrete tank of 3,000 gallons (ca 13 cu. m.). The operation of the fountain is controlled by a time switch.'

Other site observations
Two "London / hybrid" plane, Platanus x acerifolia (syn. P. x hispanica) trees dating from the time when the fountain was completed are considered to be of significance.

The curtilage for the SHR listing is in the shape of a triangle with its three corners enclosing the three main viewing cones towards the fountain, from Darlinghurst Road, from Macleay Street north and from the Police Station. Within this curtilage are many non-significant or intrusive urban design elements including: roads and traffic signals; a Telstra telephone booth; a glass enclosed bus shelter; a tourist sign-post showing directions / distance to numerous world cities; a light post with multiple circular lights; a large bronze sculpture "Angled Wheels of Fortune" designed and donated by property developer Dennis Wolanski in 1988; a cafe with large awnings and cafe furniture; and a significant amount of recently planted vegetation. Although worthwhile in their own right, many of these elements interfere with views towards the fountain and should be repositioned when possible.

Heritage listing 
As at 28 October 2010, The El Alamein Memorial Fountain is of State significance as a spectacular fountain and outstanding work of modernist design in water which has been copied all over the world. Throughout the decades of the 1960s and 1970s it was an icon of Sydney, rivalling the Sydney Harbour Bridge and the Sydney Opera House for the frequency with which it was represented in tourism imagery. Aesthetically it is rare in NSW as a local adaptation of the organic school of Scandinavian architectural design and as an example of the application of modernist design technology to fountain design.

The El Alamein Memorial Fountain is of State significance as a war memorial to the Australian soldiers of the 9th Division who fought near the Egyptian town of El Alamein in two battles which helped turn the course of World War II towards victory for the Allies. It is also of State significance for its associations with its designer Bob Woodward, a World War II veteran whose career was consequently shifted into national and international prominence as a fountain designer largely because of its popular and critical success. It is rare as a war memorial in NSW which commemorates a battle rather than the loss of individual members of the armed forces. It is also unusual because its beauty as a fountain has historically almost overwhelmed its solemn function a war memorial.

El Alamein Memorial Fountain was listed on the New South Wales State Heritage Register on 14 January 2011 having satisfied the following criteria.

The place is important in demonstrating the course, or pattern, of cultural or natural history in New South Wales.

The El Alamein Memorial Fountain is of State historical heritage significance as a war memorial to the battles fought by Australian soldiers near the Egyptian town of El Alamein which helped turn the course of World War II towards victory for the Allies. The Australians paid a fearful price for their involvement, suffering almost 6,000 casualties between July and November 1942.

The place has a strong or special association with a person, or group of persons, of importance of cultural or natural history of New South Wales's history.

The El Alamein Memorial Fountain is of State significance for its historical associations with the Australian soldiers of the 9th Division who fought near the Egyptian town of El Alamein in two battles which helped turn the course of World War II. It is also of State significance for its associations with its designer Bob Woodward, a World War II veteran whose career as a fountain designer was consequently reoriented into national and international prominence largely because of its popular and critical success.

The place is important in demonstrating aesthetic characteristics and/or a high degree of creative or technical achievement in New South Wales.

The El Alamein Memorial Fountain is of State aesthetic significance as a spectacular fountain and outstanding work of modernist design in water which has been copied all over the world. It was described by architectural historian Max Freeland as "a splendid sculpture in water. Its ephemeral ever-changing ever-remaining lightness dances tantalizingly in the sunshine or turns the reflections of gaudy neon lights into jewels at night. Its poetry was a sculptural breakthrough not only in Australia but in the world". Throughout the decades of the 1960s and 1970s it was an icon of Sydney, rivalling the Sydney Harbour Bridge and the Sydney Opera House for the frequency with which it was represented in tourism imagery. Described as "an important technological innovation in fountain design" (the NSW chapter of the Institute of Architects created a new design category for it, the "Civic Design Award" of which it became the inaugural winner in 1964.

The place possesses uncommon, rare or endangered aspects of the cultural or natural history of New South Wales.

The El Alamein Memorial Fountain is of State significance for its rarity as a war memorial in NSW which commemorates a battle rather than the loss of individual members of the armed forces. It is also unusual because its beauty as a fountain has historically almost overwhelmed its solemn function as a war memorial.

The place is important in demonstrating the principal characteristics of a class of cultural or natural places/environments in New South Wales.

The El Alamein Memorial Fountain is of State significance as an example of internationally outstanding fountain design and representative of excellence in Australian modernist design of the mid twentieth century.

Similar fountains

A similar fountain can be found in Szczytna, in south-western Poland.

A similar fountain can be found in Houston, Texas. The Gus S. Wortham Memorial Fountain was inspired by the El Alamein Fountain.

Minneapolis, Minnesota’s Berger Fountain (1971) is a copy, funded by Ben Berger, a former parks commissioner who saw the original. This copy was built by Woodward in Australia and shipped to Minnesota, where it was installed on a base (1974-75) that he approved.

Tupperware Brands' world headquarters in Kissimmee, Florida has a replica of the fountain (1970) dedicated to the millions of independent sellers around the world.

Nuneaton in the UK has a similar fountain called the Dandelion Fountain, voted 'UK Roundabout of the Year'.

There is a similar fountain in Oslo, Norway.

See also
 List of public art in the City of Sydney
 Modernism

References

Bibliography

Attribution

External links

Fountains in Sydney
Monuments and memorials in Sydney
Kings Cross, New South Wales
New South Wales State Heritage Register
Australian military memorials
Articles incorporating text from the New South Wales State Heritage Register